Kwon Do-Hyung, more commonly known as Do Kwon, is the South Korean co-founder and CEO of Singapore-based Terraform Labs, the parent company of crashed stablecoin TerraUSD and cryptocurrency Luna. TerraUSD and Luna collapsed in May 2022, wiping out almost $45 billion market capitalization in one week and causing hundreds of billions in losses in the larger crypto market. Kwon faces legal and social pressure regarding his role in the Terra crash. Citizens from various jurisdictions — including South Korea, Singapore, and the United States — are taking legal action against Kwon.

Education and early career 

According to his tweet on 6 September 2021, Do Kwon was born in Seoul, South Korea, on that same day in 1991. He attended high school at Daewon Foreign Language High School in South Korea. After receiving his BS in computer science in 2015 at Stanford University, he transitioned to work briefly as a software engineer for both Microsoft and Apple.

In January 2016, Kwon returned to South Korea to develop and found his startup, Anyfi.

Career

Terraform Labs 
Do Kwon co-founded Terraform Labs Pte. Ltd. in January 2018 with entrepreneur Daniel Shin. Later in 2018, Terraform Labs released a cryptocurrency called Luna. Terraform began selling its stablecoin, TerraUSD (UST), in 2020. Terra blockchain, which includes both UST and Luna, had stable mining incentives that were purported to create an elastic monetary policy alongside an efficient fiscal policy to counteract potential low adoption and limited use cases. The UST stablecoin used an algorithm linked to the Luna supply to maintain a value of around $1, unlike other coins that are pegged to cash. The value of Luna eventually reached over $116 in April 2022.

During his time at Terraform Labs, Kwon also worked on various blockchain projects, including Mirror, Prism, Astroport, and Anchor. The Mirror token, known as MIR, runs on a decentralized finance platform related to Terra. MIR allows people to disregard current restrictions on stocks and other assets by making it easier to create and trade synthetic versions.

Following the crash of sister currencies Luna and TerraUSD in May 2022, Terraform Labs began trading a new cryptocurrency termed Luna 2.0 in June 2022. However, the release of Luna 2.0, now called LUNA on trading platforms, drew pushback from investors and critics. As a result of the crash, TerraUSD and Luna are now referred to as TerraClassicUSD and LUNC, respectively.

Regulatory issues 

The U.S. Securities and Exchange Commission (SEC) began an investigation of Terraform Labs in June 2022 to determine if the marketing of the TerraUSD stablecoin violated federal regulations on securities and investment products. Following the crash in May 2022, the SEC investigation seeks to determine whether TerraUSD and its underlying algorithms worked as marketed or if it violated federal investor protection regulations. Despite Terraform Labs being based in Singapore, TerraUSD falls under SEC's regulations as Americans bought the token to fund businesses or seek profit. In February 2023, the SEC charged Kwon and Terraform Labs with fraud.

On 17 May 2022, members of the Korean parliament and government authorities called for a potential parliamentary hearing regarding Terraform Labs and its founder Kwon, citing the lack of regulatory framework as the main reason for the impeded investigation on the events that took place.

On 18 May 2022, following investigations led by the National Tax Service of Korea, Terraform Labs founders Kwon and Daniel Shin were asked to pay additional taxes worth approximately $100 million in December 2021. However, the two founders refused to pay on the grounds that the subsidiaries Terraform Labs Pte. Ltd. (Singapore) and Terraform Labs Virgin Islands are not Korean entities. Regardless, the National Tax Service has claimed that since "the founders had made practical management decisions" during their time as official residents in Korea, the transfer of funds between the subsidiaries and their profits made by each entity need to obey Korean jurisdiction.

Before the SEC investigation regarding TerraUSD, the U.S. Securities and Exchange Commission issued a subpoena to Terraform Labs and Kwon in 2021, specifically regarding Terraform Labs' "Mirror Protocol" that designed and offered financial derivatives that virtually "mirrored" listed stocks. Kwon responded by stating that he wouldn't comply with the demands and instead would be suing the SEC. Despite Kwon's attempts to dispute and avoid investigations from the SEC, a U.S. Court hearing in Manhattan in February 2022 ruled in favor of the SEC's right to continue its investigation into Kwon and Terraform Labs. According to documents filed by Kwon at the Supreme Court of Korea's Registry Office, Kwon filed to dissolve the company's Korean entity on 30 April 2022 and was approved on 4 May 2022.

Collapse of Terra blockchain 
Beginning on 9 May 2022, Terraform Labs made headlines after UST started to break its peg to the US dollar. Over the next week, the price of UST plunged to 10 cents, while Luna fell from an all-time high of $119.51 to "virtually zero." The collapse wiped out almost $45 billion of market capitalization in one week.

The Terra blockchain began its collapse on 7 May 2022 when several prominent investors sold over $285 million worth of UST. On 8 May 2022, the value of UST hit a low of $0.985, and the Luna Foundation Guard (LFG), created to be a reserve for Luna, loaned a total of $1.5 billion to defend the peg and subside the volatility of UST.

The crash contributed to hundreds of billions of dollars lost across the crypto ecosystem.

Class actions

With approximately 200,000 South Korean Luna investors harmed by the crash, groups of Korean investors announced that they would be filing a class-action lawsuit against Terraform Labs. The South Korean government also announced that it would pursue Cofounder Kwon on criminal charges. As of 17 May, more than 1,600 investors have signed up for the lawsuit with domestic law firms LKB & Partners LLC and Kisung LLC.

In the United States, a class action, Patterson v. TerraForm Labs Pte Ltd. et al., was filed against Kwon and others in the United States District Court for the Northern District of California on 17 June 2022. Briefs are being presented to the United States District Court for the Northern District of California under the counsel of Scott + Scott Attorneys at Law LLP, The Rosen Law Firm PA, Kahn Swick Foti LLP, and Bragar Eagel & Squire P.C., accusing Do Kwon and Terraform Labs of soliciting unregistered securities while misleading investors about their viability.

In September 2022, a $56.9 million class action was filed at the High Court of Singapore against Kwon, Terraform Labs, Nikolaos Alexandros Platias and the Luna Foundation Guard.

In February 2023, US financial regulators charged Do Kwon and TerraForm Labs with "orchestrating a multi-billion dollar crypto asset securities fraud".

Arrest warrants

On 21 June 2022, YTN reported that prosecutors were looking to invalidate Kwon's South Korean passport. On 14 September 2022, a South Korean court issued an arrest warrant for Kwon and five others on allegations of violations of Korean capital markets law. The prosecutor's office said all six individuals were located in Singapore. On 19 September 2022, the Seoul Southern District Prosecutors' Office said they had begun the procedure to place Kwon on the Interpol red notice list and revoke his passport. In December 2022, South Korean authorities shared their belief that Kwon was hiding in Serbia, as this country doesn't have an extradition treaty with South Korea.

Personal life
Kwon named his daughter Luna, announcing the birth in April 2022 by tweeting, "My dearest creation named after my greatest invention."

On 12 May 2022, an individual investor who claims to have lost approximately $2 million allegedly trespassed into Kwon’s high-rise condominium building to demand an apology. As a result, Kwon’s wife filed and requested emergency police protection, and South Korean police began investigating the incident.

In October 2022, during an interview with Unchained Podcast, Kwon was asked about the invalidation of his South Korean passport by the South Korean government, to which he responded "Oh, I'm not using it anyway, so it doesn't, I can't see how that makes a difference to me." When asked if he had another passport, Kwon said he wasn't comfortable answering questions related to that or his travel plans.

Recognition
 2019: Named in Forbes 30 Under 30 - Asia - Finance & Venture Capital

References

External links 
 Do Kwon on Twitter

1991 births
21st-century engineers
21st-century South Korean businesspeople
Living people
People associated with cryptocurrency
South Korean chief executives
South Korean engineers
Stanford University alumni